Dijon-Prenois is a  motor racing circuit located in Prenois, near Dijon, France. The undulating track is noted for its fast, sweeping bends.

Opened in 1972, Dijon-Prenois hosted the Formula One French Grand Prix five times, and the Swiss Grand Prix in 1982. The non-championship 1975 Swiss Grand Prix was also held at Dijon. The circuit currently hosts the Grand Prix de l'Age d'Or, and last hosted the FFSA GT Championship in 2018.

History

Planned in 1967, work commenced in December 1969. The track was part of a plan to make Dijon an automotive centre. It was the brainchild of rugby-player and wrestler François Chambelland (sometimes assumed to be the masked wrestler l'Ange Blanc), and was developed with the aid of racers Jean-Pierre Beltoise and François Cevert, as well as motoring journalist . In spite of lack of support from the city government and a chronic lack of funds, the track was declared open on 26 May 1972, with Guy Ligier making the first timed lap around the circuit. The first race, for 2-litre prototypes, was held ten days later. Arturo Merzario was the inaugural winner.

The first F1 race was run in 1974 on the circuit's original  layout; with the fastest lap times under the one-minute mark, there was a major problem with congested traffic between the race leaders and the back-markers. Therefore, in 1976 an extension was added to lengthen the circuit as well as to reprofile many of its corners before the time F1 could return to Dijon in 1977. The 1979 French Grand Prix featured a memorable battle for second place in the final laps between Gilles Villeneuve's Ferrari and René Arnoux's Renault, which was finally won by Villeneuve. The race itself was won by Jean-Pierre Jabouille in the other Renault - Renault's first, and the first F1 victory for a turbocharged car.

The 1982 Formula One season was not to see the French Grand Prix held at Dijon as that race was held at the Paul Ricard Circuit, located at Le Castellet in southern France. Instead, Dijon held the (as yet) last Swiss Grand Prix, despite being located in France and not Switzerland. This was due to the Swiss Government's ban on motor racing in the wake of the 1955 24 Hours of Le Mans disaster in which 83 people, many of whom were spectators, and the driver Pierre Levegh, died when a car crashed at high speed and vaulted into the pit straight grandstand. 1982 Formula One World Champion Keke Rosberg, driving his Williams-Ford, won his first ever Grand Prix in the 1982 Swiss race, four seconds in front of local favourite Alain Prost driving a factory backed Renault.

The French Grand Prix alternated between Paul Ricard and Dijon, until the last F1 race at Dijon took place in 1984. The race was won by McLaren's Niki Lauda, who won his 3rd and final World Championship that year. Fittingly, the last F1 pole at Dijon was set by a French driver driving a French car, with Patrick Tambay recording a 1:02.200 in his factory Renault RE50 turbo. Tambay led the race for the first 47 laps before being passed by Lauda, the Frenchman eventually finishing 2nd, seven seconds behind the McLaren.

Long-distance racing continued, with a race in the FIA GT Championship held there in 1998 for instance. Although Formula One has not returned to Dijon since 1984, the circuit continues to be used today for minor, mostly local races. These include club level events and motorcycle racing, and truck racing events have been held there since 1988. The track was renovated in 2001, when a go-cart track was added.

Events

 Current

 May: Historic Tour Dijon
 June: GT2 European Series, Alpine Elf Europa Cup, FFSA GT Championship, Grand Prix de l'Age d'Or
 October: Dijon Motors Cup

 Former

 BMW M1 Procar Championship (1979)
 BOSS GP (2009–2010, 2012, 2015)
 BPR Global GT Series (1994)
 Deutsche Tourenwagen Masters (2009)
 Euro Formula 3000 (2002, 2004)
 European Touring Car Championship (1988)
 FIA European Formula 3 Championship (1978)
 FIA GT Championship (1998, 2006)
 Formula 3 Euro Series (2009)
 Formula 750 (1977)
 Formula One 
 French Grand Prix (1974, 1977, 1979, 1981–1982)
 Swiss Grand Prix (1984)
 French F4 Championship (2018)
 French Formula Three Championship (1978–1985, 1987–1999, 2002)
 French Formula Renault Championship (1976–1981, 1984–1985, 1991–1994, 2002–2009)
 French Supertouring Championship (1976–1987, 1989–1999, 2002–2005)
 FIA Sportscar Championship (2002)
 International Formula 3000 (1985, 1988–1989)
 NASCAR Whelen Euro Series (2009–2010, 2013)
 World Sportscar Championship (1973, 1975–1976, 1978–1980, 1989–1990)
 World Touring Car Championship (1987)

Lap records 

The outright unofficial all-time track record for the full Grand Prix Circuit is 1:01.380, set by Alain Prost in a Renault RE30B, during first qualifying for the 1982 Swiss Grand Prix. The outright unofficial all-time track record for the Short Circuit is 58.790 seconds, set by Niki Lauda in a Ferrari 312B3, during qualifying for the 1974 French Grand Prix. The fastest official race lap records at the Circuit de Dijon-Prenois are listed as:

External links
  Official website 
 Satellite picture by Google Maps

References

Formula One circuits
French Grand Prix
Swiss Grand Prix
Sports venues in Côte-d'Or
Sport in Dijon
Motorsport venues in France
World Touring Car Championship circuits